Sergey Gerasimovich Mitin (born June 14, 1951 Gorky, Soviet Union) is a Russian politician serving as a Senator from the executive authority of Novgorod Oblast since 2017. Previously, Mitin served as Governor of Novgorod Oblast, Russia from August 7, 2007 to February 13, 2017.

References

1951 births
Living people
Governors of Novgorod Oblast
Politicians from Nizhny Novgorod
United Russia politicians
21st-century Russian politicians
Second convocation members of the State Duma (Russian Federation)
Members of the Federation Council of Russia (after 2000)